Sidney Mathias is a former Republican member of the Illinois House of Representatives, who represented the 53rd district from 1999 to 2013.  In 2012, Mathias was elected as an Alternate Delegate to the Republican National Convention committed to Mitt Romney.

Previously, he was Village President of Buffalo Grove.

Electoral history

References

External links
Illinois General Assembly - Representative Sidney H. Mathias (R) 53rd District official IL House website
 https://www.facebook.com/mathiasforrep
Bills  Committees
Project Vote Smart - Senator Sidney H. Mathias (IL) profile
Follow the Money - Sidney H. Mathias
2006 2004 2002 2000 1998 campaign contributions
Illinois House Republican Caucus - Sidney Mathias profile

Living people
Mayors of places in Illinois
Republican Party members of the Illinois House of Representatives
Year of birth missing (living people)
21st-century American politicians